Events in the year 1800 in Norway.

Incumbents
Monarch: Christian VII

Events
The Lærdal Rebellion starts.

Arts and literature

 The first theatre building in Norway; Komediehuset på Engen was built.

Births

18 February - Halvor Olaus Christensen, politician (died 1891)
6 March – Gustava Kielland, author and missionary (died 1889)
11 March – Nils Otto Tank, Moravian Church religious leader, land speculator, canal and railroad promoter  (died 1864)
7 April – Peter Feilberg, newspaper editor and politician (died 1863)
8 October – Carl Roosen, cartographer and military officer (died 1880).
18 October – Christian Cornelius Paus, lawyer, civil servant and politician (died 1879)
22 October – Christian Lassen, orientalist (died 1876).

Full date unknown
Lars Johannesen Aga, politician
Hans Pedersen Herrefosser, politician
Ingebrigt Haldorsen Sæter, politician (died 1875)

Deaths
22 February – Even Hammer, civil servant (born 1732)

See also

References